Dr. Ferenc Hepp (November 3, 1909 in Békés, Hungary – November 27, 1980) was a basketball administrator. He is considered "the father of Hungarian basketball". He became the president of the Hungarian Basketball Federation in 1954 and was a member of the FIBA Central Board in the 1950s and 1960s. He was enshrined into the Naismith Memorial Basketball Hall of Fame as a contributor in 1981. In 2007, he was enshrined as a contributor into the FIBA Hall of Fame.

External links
 Basketball Hall of Fame page on Hepp
 FIBA Hall of Fame on Hepp

1909 births
1980 deaths
Naismith Memorial Basketball Hall of Fame inductees
FIBA Hall of Fame inductees
Basketball in Hungary